Orobitis is a genus of beetles belonging to the family Curculionidae.

The species of this genus are found in Europe.

Species:
 Orobitis altus Germar, 1824 
 Orobitis anceps Germar, 1824

References

Curculionidae
Curculionidae genera